The 2016 South Korean Figure Skating Championships were held at the Mokdong Ice Rink in Seoul from January 8–10, 2016. Organized by the Korean Skating Union, it was the 70th edition of the event.

Skaters competed in the disciplines of men's singles, ladies' singles, and pair skating on the senior, junior levels, and ice dancing on the senior levels for the title of national champion of South Korea. The results of the national championships were used to choose the Korean teams to the 2016 World Championships and 2016 World Junior Championships.

Senior results

Senior men

Senior ladies
You Young won the senior ladies' title at the age of 11.

Senior pairs

Senior ice dance

Junior results

Junior men

Junior ladies

Junior pairs

International team selections

World Championships

Four Continents Championships
Based on the results of the 2015 KSU President Cup Ranking Competition from December 4–6, 2015.

World Junior Championships

Winter Youth Olympics
Based on the results of the 2015 KSU President Cup Ranking Competition from December 4–6, 2015.

References

External links
 

South Korean Figure Skating Championships
South Korean Figure Skating Championships, 2016
Figure skating
January 2016 sports events in South Korea